Frederick George Kitchener (5 July 1871 – 25 May 1948) was an English first-class cricketer. Kitchener was a right-handed batsman who bowled right-arm fast-medium.

Kitchener made his first-class debut for Hampshire against Sussex in 1896 County Championship. Kitchener represented Hampshire in thirteen first-class matches for Hampshire from 1896 to 1903. Kitchener's final appearance for the county came against Worcestershire. Martin took 28 wickets for Hampshire at a bowling average of 22.50, with best figures of 6/59, which came from one of his two five wicket hauls.

Kitchener died at East Boldon, County Durham on 25 May 1948.

External links
Frederick Kitchener at Cricinfo
Frederick Kitchener at CricketArchive
Matches and detailed statistics for Frederick Kitchener

1871 births
1948 deaths
People from Hartley Wintney
English cricketers
Hampshire cricketers